The 1983–84 Toronto Maple Leafs season was the 67th season of the franchise, 57th season as the Maple Leafs.

Offseason

NHL Draft

Regular season

Final standings

Schedule and results

Player statistics

Regular season
Scoring

Goaltending

Playoffs
The Maple Leafs missed the playoffs for the first time since 1982.

Transactions
The Maple Leafs were involved in the following transactions during the 1983-84 season.

Trades

Free agents

Awards and records

Farm Teams

References
 Maple Leafs on Hockey Database

Toronto Maple Leafs seasons
Toronto Maple Leafs season, 1983-84
Toronto